Labial approximant is the name of a class of consonants.

Subclasses 

Consonants